DeSales High School,is aprivate, Roman Catholic, college-preparatory school for boys in Louisville, Kentucky, United States. It was established in 1956 and is located in the Roman Catholic Archdiocese of Louisville.

References

External links 
 

Boys' schools in Kentucky
Roman Catholic schools in Louisville, Kentucky
Catholic secondary schools in Kentucky
High schools in Louisville, Kentucky
Preparatory schools in Kentucky
Educational institutions established in 1956
1956 establishments in Kentucky